Zip Code was a concert tour by English rock band the Rolling Stones. It began on 24 May 2015 in San Diego and travelled across North America before concluding on 15 July 2015 in Quebec City. The tour was announced on 31 March 2015 with tickets going on sale to the general public two weeks later. The name is a reference to the jeans-related artwork for Sticky Fingers, which received a special re-release in 2015, and had its entire track list played during the Zip Code Tour.

History
On 31 March 2015, the Rolling Stones announced the Zip Code tour, a new United States & Canada tour subtitled Tour of North America 2015. The tour featured stadium concerts after extensive usage of said venues during the 14 On Fire European tour. Mick Jagger had declared that the band would extend the tour to South America "but it's kind of difficult to put together." Given the tour started the same year the Sticky Fingers album received a deluxe re-release, "Zip Code" is a reference to how that album's cover features the crotch of a man wearing jeans, which in the original vinyl release had a working zipper.

On 20 May 2015, the Rolling Stones performed a surprise L.A. concert at The Fonda Theatre (an intimate 1,300-person-capacity venue) in Hollywood, California, playing sixteen songs in total, including the entire ten-song track list of Sticky Fingers. The show was filmed and later released on Blu-Ray, DVD, CD and LP.

On 27 May 2015, the Rolling Stones performed a private show at Belly Up Tavern, Solana Beach, California, playing a shorter set of fifteen songs.

Set list
This set list is representative of the performance on 9 June 2015. It does not represent all concerts for the duration of the tour.

 "Start Me Up"
 "It's Only Rock 'n Roll (But I Like It)"
 "All Down the Line"
 "Tumbling Dice"
 "Doom and Gloom"
 "Can't You Hear Me Knocking"
 "You Gotta Move"
 "Some Girls"
 "Honky Tonk Women"
 "Before They Make Me Run"
 "Happy"
 "Midnight Rambler"
 "Miss You"
 "Gimme Shelter"
 "Jumpin' Jack Flash"
 "Sympathy for the Devil"
 "Brown Sugar"

Encore
"You Can't Always Get What You Want"
 "(I Can't Get No) Satisfaction"

Tour dates

Personnel

The Rolling Stones
Mick Jagger – lead vocals, guitars, harmonica, percussion
Keith Richards – rhythm guitars, backing vocals
Charlie Watts – drums
Ronnie Wood – lead guitars

Additional musicians
Darryl Jones – bass guitar, backing vocals
Chuck Leavell – keyboards, backing vocals
Lisa Fischer – backing vocals, percussion
Karl Denson – saxophone
Tim Ries – saxophone, keyboards
Matt Clifford – French horn, show introduction voice
Bernard Fowler – backing vocals, percussion

See also
 The Rolling Stones concerts

Notes

References

External links
 The Rolling Stones (Official site)

The Rolling Stones concert tours
2015 concert tours
Concert tours of the United States
Concert tours of Canada